The 1994 Hi-Tec British Open Championships was held at the Lambs Squash Club with the later stages being held at the Wembley Conference Centre from 3–11 April 1994. Jansher Khan won his third consecutive title defeating Brett Martin in the final.

Seeds

Draw and results

Final Qualifying round

Main draw

+ In the first round Mir Zaman Gul was disqualified for butting Anthony Hill after the match got out of hand.

References

Men's British Open Squash Championships
Men's British Open 
Men's British Open Squash Championship
Men's British Open Squash Championship
Men's British Open Squash Championship
Squash competitions in London